Al-Sayf is a sub-district located in Dhi al-Sufal District, Ibb Governorate, Yemen. Al-Sayf had a population of 4499 as of 2004.

References 

Sub-districts in Dhi As Sufal District